is a Japanese snowboarder who competed in the men's halfpipe at the 2018 Winter Olympics. He finished 11th overall. He fell during the final, hitting the edge of the halfpipe and injuring his hip, and had to be evacuated by medics.

Totsuka took the silver medal at the 2020 Winter X Games in Aspen, Colorado behind the gold medalist Scotty James.

References

External links

2001 births
Living people
Japanese male snowboarders
Olympic snowboarders of Japan
Snowboarders at the 2018 Winter Olympics
Snowboarders at the 2022 Winter Olympics
Sportspeople from Yokohama
21st-century Japanese people